Cane River is a 2001 family saga by Lalita Tademy. It was chosen as an Oprah's Book Club selection. 

Beginning with her great-great-great-great grandmother, Elizabeth a slave owned by a Creole family, Lalita Tademy’s historical fiction novel chronicles four generations of strong, determined black women as they battle injustice to unite their family and forge success on their own terms. They are women whose lives begin in slavery, who weather the Civil War, and who grapple with contradictions of emancipation, Jim Crow, and the pre-Civil Rights South. The culture she explores, that of slaves who remained in bondage until after the American Civil War, bears some core similarities but radical dissimilarities to that of Cane River's Melrose-St. Augustine society, whose families had lived as free from the late Spanish period of Louisiana history.

Notes

2001 novels
Family saga novels
Novels about American slavery
Novels set in Louisiana